Deut may refer to:

 Deut (coin), an historical north German and Dutch coin
 Deut, another name for Kang Kek Iew
 An abbreviation for the Book of Deuteronomy